The state of Ohio has a procedure for dedicating properties as state nature preserves through the Ohio Division of Natural Areas & Preserves. Some preserves are owned outright by the state, while others are owned by other agencies. Some are open to the public, and others are not.

List of Ohio State Nature Preserves

References

Protected areas of Ohio
Nature preserves